Liguria was a late Roman province in Italy in the 4th–6th centuries. Despite its name, it encompassed most of the modern Italian region of Piedmont and parts of Lombardy, but not the medieval and modern region of Liguria, which was included in the province of Alpes Cottiae. The province's capital was Mediolanum (Milan) and it was governed by an official of consularis rank. Administratively, it was subject to the Diocese of Annonarian Italy and to the praetorian prefecture of Italy.

Late Roman provinces
Geographical, historical and cultural regions of Italy